Soria Railway Station  is the main railway station of Soria, Spain.

References

Railway stations in Castile and León